Horace Cedric Lee (14 March 1909 – 14 July 1981) was an English cricketer. Lee was a right-handed batsman who bowled right-arm fast-medium. He was born at North Shields, Northumberland.

Lee made his debut in county cricket for Northumberland in the 1929 Minor Counties Championship against Durham. Before the start of World War II in 1939, Lee made 67 appearances for the county in the Minor Counties Championship. In 1935, Lee made his first-class debut for a combined Minor Counties team against the Oxford University at the University Parks. Batting first, the Minor Counties made 251 all out. In their second-innings, the Minor Counties made 294 all out, with Lee making 45 runs before he was once again dismissed by Whitehouse. Oxford University reached 23 without loss in their second-innings, with the match declared a draw. The following season he made a second first-class appearance for the Minor Counties against Ireland at Observatory Road, Dublin. Batting first, Ireland were dismissed for 102, which the Minor Counties responded to by making just 69 in their first-innings, which saw Lee dismissed for 5 runs by James Graham. Ireland then made 179 in their second-innings, setting the Minor Counties a target of 213 for victory. Chasing that target, the Minor Counties were dismissed for just 133, with Lee being dismissed for a single run by the same bowler. Following World War II, he played a further Minor Counties Championship match for Northumberland against Staffordshire.

He died at Wallsend, Northumberland, on 14 July 1981.

References

External links
Horace Lee at ESPNcricinfo
Horace Lee at CricketArchive

1909 births
1981 deaths
Sportspeople from North Shields
Cricketers from Tyne and Wear
English cricketers
Northumberland cricketers
Minor Counties cricketers